is a Japanese filmmaker and screenwriter from Gifu prefecture.

Filmography 
 Kuro (2012), shown at the 25th Tokyo International Film Festival

References 

 Telegraph review
 Screendaily
 The Hollywood Reporter
 influence-film

External links 
 25th TIFF interview

1976 births
Living people
Japanese film directors
Japanese screenwriters